The following list contains all 93 stations of the Hamburg U-Bahn. The Hamburg U-Bahn is operated by the Hamburger Hochbahn (HHA) under the supervision of the Hamburger Verkehrsverbund. The majority of stations are located within the borders of the city of Hamburg — only nine stations are in the German state of Schleswig-Holstein outside the city limits — and all stations are located on the right bank of the Elbe river.

Stations 

This list gives the name of each station, the lines serving the station, the quarter and the fare zones, in which it is located, and the date or dates opened. All stations are located in the fare zone Greater Hamburg Area. Included are all stations currently open on the Hamburg U-Bahn.

See also 
 List of railway stations in Hamburg
 List of Hamburg S-Bahn stations

Notes 
A. The Hamburger Verkehrsverbund uses a system of concentric zones for the calculation of fares between stations. Fares between any station in one zone and any station in another are the same, irrespective of the start and end points of the journey or the route used.
All stations are located in the fare zone Greater Hamburg Area.
B. Where more than one line serves a station, lines are listed in numerical order.
C. The asterisk indicates a locality in the German state of Schleswig-Holstein.
Where a station is located on the border between two localities, these are listed alphabetically.
D. Connections to the Hamburg S-Bahn and other railways.
E. Former name: 1921–1952: Ahrensburg
F. Former names: 1921–1934: Langenhorn Süd, 1934–1954: Flughafen, 1954–1983: Flughafenstraße
G. Former name: 1912–192x: Hafentor

References 

General

External links 

Website of the Hamburger Hochbahn 

Hamburg
U-Bahn stations
!
 
 
Hamburg